Marcel Nkueni (born 4 April 1978) is a retired footballer from DR Congo. He was a member of the DR Congo squad for the 1998 and 2000 Africa Cup of Nations.

References

1978 births
Living people
Footballers from Kinshasa
Democratic Republic of the Congo footballers
Democratic Republic of the Congo expatriate footballers
Democratic Republic of the Congo international footballers
2000 African Cup of Nations players
1998 African Cup of Nations players
Orlando Pirates F.C. players
Daring Club Motema Pembe players
Winners Park F.C. players
Polokwane City F.C. players
Quang Nam FC players
SHB Da Nang FC players
Democratic Republic of the Congo expatriate sportspeople in South Africa
Democratic Republic of the Congo expatriate sportspeople in Vietnam
Expatriate soccer players in South Africa
Expatriate footballers in Vietnam
Bay United F.C. players
Association football goalkeepers
21st-century Democratic Republic of the Congo people